Goldsmiths, University of London, legally the Goldsmiths' College, is a constituent research university of the University of London in England. It was originally founded in 1891 as The Goldsmiths' Technical and Recreative Institute by the Worshipful Company of Goldsmiths in New Cross, London. It was renamed Goldsmiths' College after being acquired by the University of London in 1904, and specialises in the arts, design, computing, humanities and social sciences. The main building on campus, known as the Richard Hoggart Building, was originally opened in 1792 and is the site of the former Royal Naval School.

According to Quacquarelli Symonds (2021), Goldsmiths ranks 12th in Communication and Media Studies, 15th in Art & Design and is ranked in the top 50 in the areas of Anthropology, Sociology and the Performing Arts. In 2020, the university enrolled over 10,000 students at undergraduate and postgraduate levels. 37% of students come from outside the United Kingdom and 52% of all undergraduates are mature students (aged 21 or over at the start of their studies). Additionally, around a third of students at Goldsmiths are postgraduate students.

History

In 1891, the Worshipful Company of Goldsmiths, one of the Livery Companies of the City of London, founded The Goldsmiths' Technical and Recreative Institute (more commonly referred to simply as the "Goldsmiths' Institute"). The Goldsmiths' Company was established in the 12th century as a medieval guild for goldsmiths, silversmiths, and jewelers. The Livery Company dedicated the foundation of its new Institute to "the promotion of technical skill, knowledge, health and general well-being among men and women of the industrial, working and artisan classes". The original Institute was based in New Cross at the site of the former Royal Naval School; the building, now known as the Richard Hoggart Building, remains the main building of the campus today.

In 1904, the institute was merged with the University of London and was re-established as Goldsmiths' College (the apostrophe was removed in 1993, and the word 'College' dropped in a rebranding in 2006). At this point Goldsmiths was the largest teacher training institution in the country. Training functions were later expanded to include refresher courses for teachers, the University Postgraduate Certificate in Education and an Art teacher's Certificate course. The college also ran its own Nursery School.

Shortly after the merger, in 1907, Goldsmiths added a new Arts building, designed by Sir Reginald Blomfield, at the back of the main building. During the Second World War it was decided to evacuate the faculty and students of the college to University College, Nottingham, a decision which proved wise both at the time and in hindsight, since the main building was struck by an incendiary bomb and gutted in 1940 (and not finally repaired until 1947).

During the 1960s, Goldsmiths experienced a rapid expansion in student numbers. It is during this period that Goldsmiths began to establish its reputation in the arts and social science fields, as well as offering a number of new teacher training qualifications. The original main building was expanded, and the Lockwood Building, Whitehead Building, Education Building, Warmington Tower and St James's Hall were all built to accommodate the influx of new students. The university also acquired a number of historic buildings in the surrounding area, including the splendid former Deptford Town Hall and Laurie Grove Baths buildings. The Richard Hoggart Building, Deptford Town Hall and the Laurie Grove Baths all retain Grade II listed building status.

In 1988, Goldsmiths became a full College of the University of London and in 1990 received its Royal Charter. Among its wardens have been Richard Hoggart, Andrew Rutherford and Ben Pimlott. The current, and first woman, Warden is Frances Corner.

In 2018, the former boiler house and public laundry of Laurie Grove Baths was refurbished and opened as Goldsmiths CCA.

In August 2019, Goldsmiths announced that it would be removing all beef products from sale and would be charging a 10p levy on bottled water and single-use plastic cups. The changes were introduced as part of the university's efforts to become carbon neutral by 2025.

Campus and location

Goldsmiths is situated in New Cross, a highly populated area of south-east London with a considerable art and music scene.

The main building, the Richard Hoggart Building, was originally designed as a school (opened in 1844) by the architect John Shaw, Jr (1803–1870). The former Deptford Town Hall building, designed by Henry Vaughan Lanchester and Edwin Alfred Rickards, acquired in 1998, is used for academic seminars and conferences. In addition to this Goldsmiths has built several more modern buildings to develop the campus, including the RIBA award-winning Rutherford Building completed in 1997, the Ben Pimlott Building designed by Will Alsop and completed in 2005, and the Professor Stuart Hall Building (formerly the New Academic Building) which was completed in 2010.

The library, or the Rutherford Building, has three floors and gives students access to an extensive range of printed and electronic resources. The third-floor library is believed to house the largest collection of audio-visual material in the UK. Goldsmiths' students, like all other students in the University of London, have full access to the collections at Senate House Library at Bloomsbury in central London.

The seven-storey Ben Pimlott Building on New Cross Road, complete with its distinctive "scribble in the sky" (made from 229 separate pieces of metal) has become a signature of modern Goldsmiths. It contains studio and teaching space for the Department of Art, as well as housing the Goldsmiths Digital Studios and the Centre for Cognition, Computation and Culture.

The Professor Stuart Hall Building (formerly the New Academic Building), situated next to the green, is home to the Media and Communications Department and the Institute for Creative and Cultural Entrepreneurship (ICCE). Facilities include a 250-seat lecture theatre, seminar and teaching rooms, as well as a cafe with outdoor seating.

Academic profile

Faculties and departments

Art
 The Head of Department is Richard Noble. Notable alumni include Damien Hirst, Sarah Lucas, Steve McQueen, Gillian Wearing, Fiona Banner, Angela Bulloch and Graham Coxon.
 The university is also a member of the Screen Studies Group, London.

Design
The Department of Design's approach to design practice grew from a concern for ethical and environmentalist design. This developed alongside research by John Wood, Julia Lockheart, and others, which informs their research into metadesign. TERU, the Technology Education Research Unit, has been instrumental in understanding how design and technology work in schools, how to encourage learners towards creative interventions that improve the made world, and how to help teachers to support that process. The Writing Purposefully in Art and Design Network (Writing-PAD) has its main Centre at Goldsmiths. The Network now spans some 70 institutions across the art and design sector with 6 national and 2 International Writing PAD Centres.

Computing
The Department of Computing lets students develop their creative potential while learning solid computing skills with programs focused on Computer Science, Computer Games Art & Design, Computational Technology, Computational Cognitive Neuroscience, Computer Games Programming, Computational Linguistics, Data Science, User Experience Engineering, and Virtual & Augmented Reality.

Sociology 
The Sociology Department include Nirmal Puwar, Les Back, Yasmin Gunaratnam, Vikki Bell and Paul Stoneman.

Cultural studies 
The Media and Communications Department, as well as the Centre for Cultural Studies, include Matthew Fuller, David Morley, Scott Lash, Angela McRobbie, Nirmal Puwar and (formerly) Sara Ahmed.

Institute for Creative and Cultural Entrepreneurship
The Institute for Creative and Cultural Entrepreneurship delivers entrepreneurship, cultural management and policy education to the creative and cultural sectors.

Anthropology
The Department of Anthropology teaching staff include Keith Hart and (formerly) David Graeber. The department is known for its focus on visual anthropology. The realm of continental philosophy is represented with academics such as Saul Newman, Alberto Toscano and Jean Paul Martinon as well as Visiting Professors Andrew Benjamin and Bernard Stiegler. In the area of Psychology there is Chris French who specialises in the psychology of paranormal beliefs and experiences, cognition and emotion. Saul Newman – notable for developing the concept of post-anarchism – is currently leading the department of politics.

English and comparative literature
The English & Comparative Literature Department covers English, comparative literature, American literature, creative writing and linguistics. Current academics include Blake Morrison, Chris Baldick, Uttara Natarajan and Peter Dunwoodie. Its work in comparative literature developed after a merger with the Department of European Languages, later joined by its Creative Writing section.

Music 
The Research Centre for Russian Music, convened by Alexander Ivashkin until his death in 2014, is internationally renowned for its archives devoted to Prokofiev and Schnittke, and unique collections including of music by Stravinsky, and Russian Piano Music first editions.

Educational studies
The Department of Educational Studies teaches undergraduate, masters and doctoral courses, and is home to a large programme of initial teacher education (primary and secondary), based on partnership arrangements with over 1500 schools and colleges.

Additional academic programs
Goldsmiths paired with Tungsten Network in 2015 to develop a research program that explores advanced artificial intelligence techniques for Big Data and business practices. Known as Tungsten Centre for Intelligent Data Analytics, the program is based in the company's London office.

Rankings 

In 2017, Goldsmiths' Media and Communications department was named the second best in the UK and eighth worldwide, although by 2020 this department's ranking had fallen to 18th in the UK. Goldsmiths' overall national rankings are about 70th, and in the TEF Goldsmiths achieved a Bronze rating, the lowest possible ranking.

Open access to research by Goldsmiths academics 
Goldsmiths Research Online (GRO) is a repository of research publications and other research outputs conducted by academics at Goldsmiths. The repository also holds Goldsmiths' collection of doctoral theses. GRO is part of Goldsmiths Online Research Collections (ORC) which also includes Goldsmiths Journals Online (GOJO), a hosting platform for open access journals and conference proceedings.

Student life

Sports, clubs and traditions
Sports teams and societies are organised by the Goldsmiths Students' Union. The Union runs 18 sports clubs, 11 of which compete in either University of London Union or BUCS leagues.

The Students' Union runs 35 societies, ranging from political societies and identity-based societies (for example the Jewish society and the LGBT society) to interest-based societies (the Drama Society and the on-campus radio station Wired) and more.

Student media

Goldsmiths has a long history of student-led media platforms, including Smiths Magazine, The Leopard newspaper, and Wired radio. The student media is run independently by students at the college.

Student housing
Accommodation Services offers accommodation within seven halls:
 Loring Hall
 Ewen Henderson Court
 Quantum Court
 Town Hall Camberwell
 Surrey House
 Chesterman House
 Raymont Hall

Electricity, internet and gas bills are included in the rent. Further information may be found on the Accommodation Services website.

Students' Union

The union provides, among other things, catering facilities, a chaplaincy, a medical clinic, an advice service on academic and welfare issues and a state of the art gym for students' use.

In October 2014, the union faced critical coverage, from student newspaper The Tab after voting down a proposal to commemorate Holocaust Memorial Day, with Education Officer Sarah El-alfy describing it as "Eurocentric" and "colonialist". El-alfy offered to help put forward a redrafted version of the motion for the following Student Assembly meeting. The Union issued a statement claiming "Redrafting motions and re-entering them at a later date isn’t unusual in Students' Unions and shouldn't be misinterpreted as opposition."

In 2015 the student union Welfare and Diversity Officer, Bahar Mustafa, caused a public controversy by banning white people and men from a student union event. Bahar Mustafa caused more public controversy through her justification of the ban, and through her use of the hash tag #KillAllWhiteMen. A group of students petitioned for a vote of no confidence in her, but the petition was signed by less than 3% of the student body and therefore failed to trigger a referendum.

Notable alumni

Goldsmiths' alumni have been influential in the fields of art, design, visual arts, film, journalism, literature, theatre, comedy, music, politics, history, and sport.

Alumni of the Department of Art include Mark Wallinger, Damien Hirst, Antony Gormley, Sam Taylor-Johnson, Lucian Freud, Mary Quant, Bridget Riley, Sarah Lucas, Gary Hume, Steve McQueen, Carl Hopgood, Ely Dagher, Michael Dean, Gillian Wearing, Brian Molko and Benjamin Spiers.

The Department of Music has a number of notable alumni, including Tunday Akintan, Martyn Brabbins, Katy B, James Blake, John Cale, A. G. Cook, Peter Graham, Robin Haigh, Rosie Lowe, Malcolm McLaren, Benedict Taylor, Shirley Thompson, Errollyn Wallen, Alastair White and Roger Williams.

Other alumni include TV presenter Dave Myers, DJ and producer SHERELLE, Bollywood actor Kalki Koechlin, artist and pioneer Beatie Wolfe, graphic novelist Malik Sajad, BBC weather presenter Wendy Hurrell, film director and editor in chief of Kurdish Question Mehmet Aksoy, lead singer of Placebo Brian Molko (drama graduate), founding members of the British rock band Blur Alex James (French graduate) and Graham Coxon (fine arts graduate), Kathak dancer Nighat Chaudhry.

See also
 Armorial of UK universities
 E-scape
 Forensic Architecture
 Goldsmiths CCA
 List of Goldsmiths College people
 List of universities in the UK

References

External links 

 
 The official Goldsmiths Students' Union website
 Goldsmiths, University of London lists of students
 Goldsmiths, University of London military personnel,1914–1918

 
Education in the London Borough of Lewisham
Educational institutions established in 1891
Grade II listed educational buildings
Grade II listed buildings in the London Borough of Lewisham
1891 establishments in England
New Cross
Organisations based in the London Borough of Lewisham
1891 in London
Universities UK
University of London